Caddyshack is a 1980 American sports comedy film directed by Harold Ramis, written by Brian Doyle-Murray, Ramis and Douglas Kenney, and starring Chevy Chase, Rodney Dangerfield, Ted Knight, Michael O'Keefe and Bill Murray with supporting roles by Sarah Holcomb, Cindy Morgan, and Doyle-Murray.

Caddyshack was Ramis's directorial debut  and boosted the career of Dangerfield, who was previously known mostly for his stand-up comedy. Grossing nearly $40 million at the domestic box office (the 17th-highest of the year), it was the first of a series of similar comedies.

The film has a cult following and was described by ESPN as "perhaps the funniest sports movie ever made."

A sequel, Caddyshack II (1988), followed, although only Chase reprised his role.

Plot
Danny Noonan works as a caddie at the exclusive Bushwood Country Club in Illinois to earn money to pay for college. Danny caddies for Ty Webb, a mischievous lothario and the son of one of Bushwood's cofounders. Danny tries to gain acceptance from Judge Elihu Smails, the country club's haughty cofounder and director of the caddie scholarship program, by caddying for him. Meanwhile, Carl Spackler, a mentally unstable greenskeeper who lives in the maintenance building, is sent by his Scottish supervisor Sandy McFiddish to hunt a gopher that Judge Smails witnessed damaging the course. He attempts to kill it with a rifle and high-pressure hose but fails.

Al Czervik, a loud and free-spirited nouveau riche golfer and successful real estate developer, begins attending the club as a guest of member Drew Scott. Czervik distracts Smails as he tees off, causing his shot to go wrong. Later bored by slow play, Czervik wagers with Smails. Smails is enraged for losing the bet and angrily throws his putter, injuring an elderly woman. Danny takes the blame for the incident to impress Smails. Smails encourages him to apply for the caddie scholarship.

At Bushwood's annual Fourth of July banquet, Danny and his girlfriend, Maggie, work as wait staff under Lou Loomis. Czervik continues to bully Smails and the older club members while entertaining and befriending the younger ones, as well as the staff, to whom he consistently hands out generous amounts of cash as tips. Danny becomes attracted to Lacey Underall, Smails' promiscuous niece, who is visiting for the summer and frequents the club.

Later, Danny wins the Caddy Day golf tournament and the scholarship, earning him an invitation from Smails to attend the christening ceremony for his boat at the nearby Rolling Lakes Yacht Club. Smails's boat is sunk at the event after a collision with Czervik's larger boat. Returning home, Smails discovers Lacey and Danny in bed at his house. Expecting to be fired or to have the scholarship revoked, Danny is surprised when Smails only demands that he keeps the escapade secret.

Unable to bear the continued presence of the uncouth Czervik, Smails confronts him and announces that he will never be granted membership. Czervik counters by announcing that he would never consider being a member: He insults the country club and claims to be there merely to evaluate buying it and developing the land into condominiums. After a brief fight and exchange of insults, Webb suggests they discuss the situation over drinks. After Smails demands satisfaction, Czervik proposes a team golf match with Smails and his regular golfing partner Dr. Beeper against Czervik and Webb. Against club rules, they also agree to a $20,000 wager on the match, which quickly doubles to $40,000. That evening, Webb practices for the game against Smails, and his errant shot brings him to meet Carl; the two share a bottle of wine and a joint.

The match is held the next day. Word spreads of the stakes involved, drawing in a crowd of club members and employees. During the game, Smails and Beeper take the lead, while Czervik, to his chagrin, is "playing the worst game of his life"; at the same time, Webb grows increasingly distracted and also plays a poor game. Czervik reacts to Smails's heckles by impulsively doubling the wager to $80,000 per team. When his own ricocheting ball strikes his arm, Czervik fakes an injury in hopes of having the contest declared a draw. Lou, who is acting as an umpire, tells Czervik his team will forfeit unless they find a substitute. When Webb chooses Danny, Smails threatens to revoke his scholarship, but Czervik promises Danny that he will make it "worth his while" if he wins. Danny chooses to play.

Upon reaching the final hole, the score is tied. Judge Smails scores a birdie. Danny has to complete a difficult putt to win. Czervik again doubles the wager based on Danny making the putt. Danny's putt leaves the ball hanging over the edge of the hole. At that moment, in his latest attempt to kill the gopher, Carl detonates plastic explosives that he has rigged around the golf course. Several explosions shake the ground and cause the ball to drop into the hole, handing Danny, Webb, and Czervik victory on the wager. Smails refuses to pay, so Czervik summons two intimidating men named Moose and Rocco to "help the judge find his checkbook". As Smails is chased across the course, Czervik quotes to the onlookers, "Hey, everybody, we're all gonna get laid!" and a party begins. 

Some distance away, the gopher emerges from underground, unharmed, and dances to the film's main theme, "I'm Alright," amid the smoldering ruins of the golf course as the credits roll.

Cast

Production
The film was inspired by writer and co-star Brian Doyle-Murray's memories of working as a caddie at Indian Hill Club in Winnetka, Illinois. His brothers Bill and John Murray (production assistant and a caddy extra) and director Harold Ramis also had worked as caddies when they were teenagers. Many of the characters in the film were based on characters they had encountered through their various experiences at the club, including a young woman upon whom the character of Maggie is based and the Haverkamps, a doddering old couple, John and Ilma, longtime members of the club, who can barely hit the ball out of their shadows. The scene in which Al Czervik hits Judge Smails in the genitals with a struck golf ball happened to Ramis on what he said was the second of his two rounds of golf, on a nine-hole public course.

The film was shot over eleven weeks during the autumn of 1979; Hurricane David in early September delayed production. Golf scenes were filmed at the Rolling Hills Golf Club (now the Grande Oaks Golf Club) in Davie, Florida. According to Ramis, Rolling Hills was chosen because the course did not have any palm trees. He wanted the film to feel that it was in the Midwest, not Florida. The explosions that take place during the climax of the film were reported at the nearby Fort Lauderdale airport by an incoming pilot, who suspected that a plane had crashed. The Fourth of July dinner and dancing scene was filmed at the Boca Raton Hotel and Club in Boca Raton, Florida, while the yacht club scene was shot at the Rusty Pelican Restaurant in Key Biscayne, Florida.

The scene that begins when Ty Webb's golf ball crashes into Carl Spackler's shack was not in the original script. It was added by director Harold Ramis after realizing that two of his biggest stars, Chevy Chase and Bill Murray, did not appear in a scene together. The three met for lunch and wrote the scene. This is the only film that Chase and Murray have appeared in together.

Murray improvised much of the "Cinderella story" scene based on two lines of stage direction. Ramis gave him direction to act as a child. Murray hit flowers with a grass whip while fantasizing aloud about winning the U.S. Masters; a major golf tournament. Murray was with the production only six days, and his lines were largely unscripted. Murray was working on Saturday Night Live at the time, and was not intended to have a large role but his part "mushroomed" and he was repeatedly recalled from New York to film additional scenes as production continued.

Cindy Morgan said that a massage scene with Chevy Chase was improvised, and her reaction to Chase dousing her back with the massage oil, where she exclaimed "You're crazy!" was genuine. A scene in which her character dove into the pool was acted by a professional diver. Before the diver took over, she was led to the diving board by the crew and carefully directed up the ladder since she could not wear her contact lenses near the pool and was legally blind without them.

A deal was made with John Dykstra's effects company for visual effects, including lightning, stormy sky effects, flying golf balls and disappearing greens' flags. The gopher was part of the effects package. Dykstra's technicians added hydraulic animation to the puppet, including ear movement, and built the tunnels through which it moved.

The production became infamous for the amount of drug usage which occurred on-set, with supporting actor Peter Berkrot describing cocaine as "the fuel that kept the film running."

Reception

Critical response
Caddyshack was released on July 25, 1980, in 656 theaters, and grossed $3.1 million during its opening weekend; it went on to make $39,846,344 in North America, and $60 million worldwide.

The film was met with underwhelming reviews in its original release, with criticism towards the disorganized plot, though Dangerfield, Chase and Murray's comic performances were well received. Roger Ebert gave the film two-and-a-half stars out of four and wrote, "Caddyshack feels more like a movie that was written rather loosely, so that when shooting began there was freedom—too much freedom—for it to wander off in all directions in search of comic inspiration." Gene Siskel gave the film three out of four stars, saying it was "funny about half of the time it tries to be, which is a pretty good average for a comedy." Dave Kehr, in his review for the Chicago Reader, wrote, "The first-time director, Harold Ramis, can't hold it together: the picture lurches from style to style (including some ill-placed whimsy with a gopher puppet) and collapses somewhere between sitcom and sketch farce." Vincent Canby gave it a mixed review in The New York Times, describing it as "A pleasantly loose-limbed sort of movie with some comic moments, most of them belonging to Mr. Dangerfield."

Nevertheless, the film has gained a cult following in the years after its release and has been positively reappraised by many film critics. On review aggregator Rotten Tomatoes, the film holds an approval rating of 72% based on 60 reviews, with an average score of 6.60/10. The website's critical consensus reads, "Though unabashedly crude and juvenile, Caddyshack nevertheless scores with its classic slapstick, unforgettable characters, and endlessly quotable dialogue." On Metacritic, the film received a score of 48 based on 12 reviews, indicating "mixed or average reviews".

Christopher Null gave the film four stars out of five in his 2005 review, and wrote, "They don't make 'em like this anymore … The plot wanders around the golf course and involves a half-dozen elements, but if you simply dig the gopher, the caddy, and the Dangerfield, you're not going to be doing half bad."

Tiger Woods said that he liked the film, and played Spackler in an American Express commercial based on the film. Many of the film's quotes are part of popular culture.

Ramis noted in the DVD documentary that TV Guide had originally given the film two stars (out of four) when it began showing on cable television in the early 1980s, but over time the rating had gone up to three stars. In 2009, he said, "I can barely watch it. All I see are a bunch of compromises and things that could have been better," such as the poor swings of everyone, except for O'Keefe.

Denmark was the only place outside the United States where Caddyshack was initially a hit. The distributor had cut 20 minutes to emphasize Bill Murray's role.

Accolades
This film is also second on Bravo's "100 Funniest Movies."

The film is recognized by American Film Institute in these lists:
 2000: AFI's 100 Years...100 Laughs – #71
 2005: AFI's 100 Years...100 Movie Quotes:
 Carl Spackler: "Cinderella story. Outta nowhere. A former greenskeeper, now, about to become the Masters champion. It looks like a mirac... It's in the hole! It's in the hole! It's in the hole!" – #92
 2008: AFI's 10 Top 10:
 #7 Sports Film

Soundtrack

In anticipation of the movie, the Kenny Loggins single "I'm Alright" was released nearly three weeks before the movie opened and became a top ten hit the last week of September 1980. CBS Records also issued a soundtrack to Caddyshack later that year. It included ten songs, four of which were performed by Kenny Loggins, including the aforementioned "I'm Alright."

Sequel 
There was a sequel called Caddyshack II (1988) which performed poorly at the box office and is considered one of the worst sequels of all time. Only Chevy Chase reprised his role.

Books
In 2007, Taylor Trade Publishing released The Book of Caddyshack, an illustrated paperback retrospective of the movie, with cast and crew Q&A interviews. The book was written by Scott Martin.

In April 2018, Flatiron Books published Caddyshack: The Making of a Hollywood Cinderella Story by Chris Nashawaty, detailing the making of the film.

Caddyshack restaurants
On June 7, 2001, Bill Murray, Brian Doyle-Murray and their brothers opened a themed restaurant inspired by the film at the World Golf Village, near St. Augustine, Florida. The restaurant is meant to resemble the fictional Bushwood Country Club, and serves primarily American cuisine. The brothers are all active partners and make occasional appearances at the restaurant. Three more Caddyshack restaurants were opened, in Myrtle Beach, South Carolina; Orlando; and Ponte Vedra Beach, Florida. These are now closed, leaving the original in St. Augustine their flagship location, open to fans and diners.

Bill Murray and two of his brothers, Andy and Joel, were in attendance when another venue opened in Rosemont, Illinois, in April 2018.

References

External links

 
 
 
 
 
 Caddyshack, an homage to Doug Kenney, ESPN/Golf Digest, April 2004
 "Caddyshack Culture" – Meta-critique from the erstwhile Suck.com.
 2009 documentary Caddyshack: The Inside Story on IMDB

1980 comedy films
1980 directorial debut films
1980 films
1980s American films
1980s English-language films
1980s satirical films
1980s screwball comedy films
1980s sports comedy films
American satirical films
American screwball comedy films
American sports comedy films
American films about revenge
Films about social class
Films directed by Harold Ramis
Films scored by Johnny Mandel
Films set in Illinois
Films shot in Florida
Films with screenplays by Brian Doyle-Murray
Films with screenplays by Douglas Kenney
Films with screenplays by Harold Ramis
Golf films
Puppet films
Orion Pictures films
Warner Bros. films